Kishuara (from Kiswara, the Aymara name for Buddleja incana) is one of the nineteen districts of the Andahuaylas Province in Peru.

Geography 
Other mountains are listed below:

Ethnic groups 
The people in the district are mainly indigenous citizens of Quechua descent. Quechua is the language which the majority of the population (94.77%) learn to speak in childhood, while 4.83% of the residents speak Spanish as a first language (2007 Peru Census).

See also 
 Suqtaqucha

References

Districts of the Andahuaylas Province
Districts of the Apurímac Region